The 1954–55 Toronto Maple Leafs season saw the Maple Leafs finish in third place in the National Hockey League (NHL) with a record of 24 wins, 24 losses, and 22 ties for 70 points. They were swept in the semi-finals by the eventual Stanley Cup champion Detroit Red Wings.

Offseason

Regular season

Final standings

Record vs. opponents

Schedule and results

Playoffs

Player statistics

Regular season
Scoring

Goaltending

Playoffs
Scoring

Goaltending

Awards and records

Transactions

See also
 1954–55 NHL season

References

External links

Toronto Maple Leafs season, 1954-55
Toronto Maple Leafs seasons
Tor